The Great Puzzle is an album by the American musician Jules Shear, released in 1992. The initial pressings of the album were packaged with the acoustic EP Unplug This.

"The Sad Sound of the Wind" was the first single. Shear promoted the album with a North American tour, including shows with Alison Moyet. The album sold fewer than 100,000 copies.

Production
The album was produced by Stewart Lerman and Shear. Shear considered it to be made up of independent songs taken from his life experience; he tried to avoid writing songs that contained overt social themes. Shear employed the lower end of his vocal range on many tracks. Tony Levin played bass on the album. "Something Else to Me" is about the death of a former girlfriend.

Critical reception

The Philadelphia Daily News deemed the album a "philosophical jigsaw of love's fragmented state." The Chicago Tribune praised the "fresh-sounding chord changes, articulate lyrics and irresistible choruses." The Calgary Herald determined that Shear "tempers his incredible facility for hook-drive melodicism with a bracing dose of metaphorical allusiveness."

Rolling Stone note that Shear "focuses primarily on the games lovers play ... Shear mitigates his skepticism with tenderness." The Washington Post called the title track one of Shear's "would-be metaphysical riddles." The Los Angeles Times stated that the album "finds him wading comfortably within the more eccentric rapids of the mainstream."

AllMusic wrote that "The Great Puzzle stands as Shear's high point." The Gazette considered it to be "one of 1992's finest pop albums."

Track listing

References

1992 albums
Polydor Records albums